Tørris Heggelund (9 October 1872 – 1 May 1940) was a Norwegian jurist and politician.

Heggelund was born in Etne and settled in Kristiansand. 
He was elected representative to the Stortinget for the periods 1919–1921, 1922–1924, 1925–1927 and 1928–1930, for the Conservative Party.

References

1872 births
1940 deaths
People from Etne
Norwegian jurists
Politicians from Kristiansand
Conservative Party (Norway) politicians
Members of the Storting